Liezel Marie Arintoc Lopez (born October 2, 1997) is a Filipino actress. She was a finalist at the sixth season of reality talent competition, Starstruck in 2016, and has been signed to GMA Artist Center. She joined the cast of Bubble Gang alongside fellow contestants Analyn Barro and Arra San Agustin.

Life and career 
Prior to joining StarStruck, Lopez was a theater actress and model in her hometown, Olongapo City. Due to financial hardships and her dream to become an actress, Lopez joined Starstruck, where her prowess in acting earned her a spot in the Final 14. After being eliminated alongside Avery Paraiso, she signed an exclusive contract with GMA Artist Center.

Filmography

Television Series

Television Anthologies

References 

1997 births
Living people
Filipino television actresses
Filipino female dancers
GMA Network personalities
StarStruck (Philippine TV series) participants
Actresses from Zambales
People from Olongapo
Tagalog people